Elbert Leon Kimbrough (born March 24, 1938) is a former professional American football player who played safety for seven seasons for the Los Angeles Rams, the San Francisco 49ers, and the New Orleans Saints.

References 

1938 births
Living people
People from Galesburg, Illinois
Players of American football from Illinois
American football cornerbacks
Northwestern Wildcats football players
Los Angeles Rams players
San Francisco 49ers players
New Orleans Saints players